Hopea latifolia is a tree in the family Dipterocarpaceae. The specific epithet latifolia means "wide leaf".

Description
It has buttresses and stilt roots. The bark is smooth.

Distribution and habitat
Hopea latifolia is native to Peninsular Malaysia and Borneo.

References

latifolia
Flora of Borneo
Flora of Peninsular Malaysia
Plants described in 1939